Perfect Stranger is the fourth studio album by Canadian rapper K.Maro. The album was released on October 28, 2008. Two singles were released from the album. Some of the songs are in collaboration with various artists like Imposs, Belly and Rad, Odessa Thornhill and Jonas.

Track listing
"Out In The Streets" featuring Jim Jones
"Let It Show"
"Love It Or Leave It" featuring Imposs
"Take You Away"
"All Over Again"
"Good Old Days"
"Take It Slow"
"Change The Game" featuring Belly & Rad
"Never Walk Away" featuring Odessa Thornhill
"Missing You"
"Not Your Time To Go"
"Take You Away (Part 2)" featuring Jonas
"Keep My Grind"
"Celebration"

Singles
"Out in the Streets"
"Take You Away"

2008 albums
K.Maro albums